"A Winter's Tale" is a song performed by David Essex on the 1983 album The Whisper. First released as a single in 1982, it reached #2 in the UK singles chart in January 1983, kept off #1 by Phil Collins's cover version of "You Can't Hurry Love".

Production and release
"A Winter's Tale" was written by Mike Batt and Tim Rice in late 1982 in response to a request from Essex. It was released as a single in November 1982. It spent ten weeks in the UK chart, peaking at #2 on 15 January 1983. Later in 1983, the song was included on Essex's album The Whisper.

Legacy
Some time after the song's release, Tim Rice wrote an additional, third verse.

"A Winter's Tale" was used to open the musical All the Fun of the Fair, launched in 2008, in which it was performed by Louise English.

A 2008 article by Asian News International saw "A Winter's Tale" placed as the fourth worst Christmas song. However, in 2014 The Independent reported a list of 50 Best Christmas songs by PRS for Music, ranking "A Winter's Tale" as the 34th best Christmas song.

References

External links
True Winter’s Tale for David Essex fan after Muswell Hill fall

1982 singles
1982 songs
British Christmas songs
David Essex songs
Songs with lyrics by Tim Rice
Songs written by Mike Batt